Nely Galán (born 1963 in Santa Clara, Cuba) is an independent producer and a former President of Entertainment for Telemundo. She created and executively produced the FOX reality series The Swan.

Nely Galán was born Arnely Alvarez in Santa Clara, Cuba. Her parents moved to Teaneck, New Jersey in 1967 when she was five years old. During high school Galán submitted an article to Seventeen magazine which was so impressive she was asked to be a guest editor and led to a permanent position.  At the age of 22, Galán embarked on her career in entertainment as the nation's youngest station manager for WNJU TV Channel 47 in New York. Owned by Jerry Perenchio and Norman Lear, the station became the launchpad for what is now the Telemundo Network.

Galán created and produced the Telemundo reality television program La Cenicienta (Cinderella). Hosted by Eva Tamargo, the program broke ground for Telemundo's reality television programming. Different from Telemundo's telenovelas, La Cenicienta is unscripted. Minerva Ruvalcaba is featured as La Cenicienta, a woman seeking Prince Charming from 20 bachelors. Telemundo incorporated English subtitles in the program to reach both Spanish and English speaking audiences.  La Cenicienta became one of Telemundo's highest rated programs in its 50-year history.

Galán was a contestant on NBC's The Celebrity Apprentice with Donald Trump, competing for the charity Count Me In, which helps women gain economic independence. She was fired by Trump on February 7, 2008.

Galán was added to the advisory board of the Hispanic Scholarship Fund on Nov. 12, 2012. On May 31, 2016, Galán published the book Self Made: Becoming Empowered, Self-Reliant, and Rich in Every Way.

References

External links

Galan Entertainment

NBC Biography

1963 births
Living people
Participants in American reality television series
People from Teaneck, New Jersey
The Apprentice (franchise) contestants